Maria Kondratieva and Vladimíra Uhlířová were the champions from the previous edition in 2010, but both players retired from professional tennis in 2016. 

Anna Kalinskaya and Tereza Mihalíková won the title, defeating Aleksandra Krunić and Lesley Pattinama Kerkhove in the final, 4–6, 6–2, [12–10].

Seeds

Draw

Draw

References
Main Draw

Zavarovalnica Sava Portorož - Doubles